Castles in the Air is a 1923 British silent drama film directed by Fred Paul and starring Nelson Keys, Lillian Hall-Davis and Campbell Gullan. It was originally made as Let's Pretend.

Cast
 Nelson Keys   
 Lillian Hall-Davis   
 Campbell Gullan   
 Mary Rorke 
 Julian Royce

References

External links

1923 films
British drama films
British silent feature films
Films directed by Fred Paul
Films produced by G. B. Samuelson
British black-and-white films
1923 drama films
1920s English-language films
1920s British films
Silent drama films